The Arnside Bore is a tidal bore on the estuary of the River Kent in England, United Kingdom.

The bore occurs at high tides, especially spring tides, where the incoming tide of Morecambe Bay narrows into the river estuary, opposite the village of Arnside.

References

External links 

Arnside
Tidal bores
Articles containing video clips
Morecambe Bay